Rędziny may refer to the following places in Poland:
Rędziny, Lower Silesian Voivodeship (south-west Poland)
Rędziny, Łódź Voivodeship (central Poland)
Rędziny, Częstochowa County in Silesian Voivodeship (south Poland)
Rędziny, Zawiercie County in Silesian Voivodeship (south Poland)